Gerald Mark McNerney   (born June 18, 1951) is an American businessman, politician, and the U.S. representative for  from 2007 until 2023. He is a member of the Democratic Party. His district, numbered as the 11th district until 2013, was based in Stockton and included parts of San Joaquin County, East Contra Costa County, and southern Sacramento County. McNerney holds a Ph.D in mathematics. McNerney did not run for reelection in 2022.

Early life, education, and business career
McNerney was born in Albuquerque, New Mexico, the son of Rosemary (née Tischhauser) and John E. McNerney. He is of Swiss and Irish descent. He attended St. Joseph's Military Academy in Hays, Kansas, and, for two years, the United States Military Academy at West Point. After leaving West Point in 1971 in protest of U.S. involvement in the Vietnam War, he enrolled at the University of New Mexico in Albuquerque, where he received bachelor's and master's degrees and, in 1981, a Ph.D. in mathematics, with a doctoral dissertation in differential geometry focusing on a generalization of the Laplace–Beltrami operator.

McNerney served several years as a contractor to Sandia National Laboratories at Kirtland Air Force Base on national security programs. In 1985, he accepted a senior engineering position with U.S. Windpower (Kenetech). In 1994, he began working as an energy consultant for PG&E, FloWind, The Electric Power Research Institute, and other utility companies. Before being elected to Congress, McNerney served as the CEO of a start-up company manufacturing wind turbines, HAWT Power (Horizontal Axis Wind Turbine Power).

U.S. House of Representatives

Elections

2004
McNerney first ran for Congress against Richard Pombo in California's 11th congressional district in the 2004 House elections. He entered the race two weeks before the primary election as a write-in candidate, encouraged by his son. He qualified as a write-in candidate for the March primary by a small margin. With no opponent, he won the primary and qualified for the November general election ballot as the Democratic nominee. He lost the general election, 61%-39%.

2006

McNerney launched his 2006 campaign early in the fall of 2005. In June 2006 he won the Democratic primary with 52.8% of the vote, defeating Steve Filson, who had been endorsed by the DCCC, and Stevan Thomas.

In late July, Republicans Pete McCloskey and Tom Benigno (both of whom ran in the Republican primary against Pombo) endorsed McNerney. In September, analysis of the campaign was changed from "Republican safe" to "Republican favored" due to the emergence of McNerney's campaign. The report noted "a [GOP] party spokesman says it's because they want to win decisively but others speculate that internal polling has delivered bad news for the incumbent." On October 3, a poll commissioned by Defenders of Wildlife Action Fund was released with McNerney leading Pombo, 48% to 46%. Based on these events, in early October, CQPolitics.com changed their rating of this race from Republican Favored to Leans Republican

On November 7, 2006, McNerney defeated Pombo, 53–47%.

2008

McNerney was reelected, 55% to 45%, over Republican nominee Dean Andal.

2010

McNerney was reelected, 48%–47%, defeating Republican nominee David Harmer.

2012

For his first three terms, McNerney represented a district that encompassed eastern Contra Costa County, most of San Joaquin County outside of Stockton, and a small portion of Santa Clara County.  After redistricting, his district was renumbered as the 9th district.  It lost its portion of Contra Costa County, including McNerney's home in Pleasanton, while picking up all of Stockton along with part of Sacramento County. After the new map was announced, McNerney announced he would move to Stockton in the new 9th. While the old 11th was a hybrid Bay Area/Central Valley district, the new 9th was more of a Central Valley district. It is slightly more Democratic than its predecessor. McNerney eventually bought a home in Stockton. He was reelected, 56%–44%, defeating Republican nominee Ricky Gill.

Tenure

In 2010, President Barack Obama signed into law a bill McNerney wrote that establishes an evaluation panel to assess the Veteran's Administration treatments for traumatic brain injury. McNerney wrote a bill in 2013 that allowed veterans to keep receiving their benefits during the government shutdown.

McNerney was one of the first lawmakers to call for the resignation of VA Secretary Eric Shinseki after revelations about delays in care at VA health care facilities.

McNerney is a proponent of renewable energy and supports cap and trade.

McNerney co-sponsored the bill To require the Secretary of Energy to prepare a report on the impact of thermal insulation on both energy and water use for potable hot water (H.R. 4801; 113th Congress), which would require the United States Secretary of Energy to prepare a report on the effects of thermal insulation on both energy consumption and systems for providing potable water in federal buildings.

In 2007, McNerney voted against legislation that would have prevented the DEA from enforcing prohibition in the 12 states (including California) that allow the use of marijuana for medical purposes.

In 2013, McNerney introduced the Methamphetamine Education, Treatment and Hope (METH) Act to expand programs that combat methamphetamine abuse.

In April 2018, McNerney, Jared Huffman, Jamie Raskin, and Dan Kildee launched the Congressional Freethought Caucus. Its stated goals include "pushing public policy formed on the basis of reason, science, and moral values", promoting the "separation of church and state", and opposing discrimination against "atheists, agnostics, humanists, seekers, religious and nonreligious persons", among others. Huffman and Raskin act as co-chairs.

As of January 2022, McNerney had voted in line with Joe Biden's stated position 100% of the time.

Committee assignments
 Committee on Energy and Commerce
 Subcommittee on Energy and Power
 Subcommittee on Commerce, Manufacturing and Trade
 Subcommittee on Environment and Economy
 Committee on Science, Space, and Technology
 Subcommittee on Energy

Caucus memberships
 Congressional Arthritis Caucus
United States Congressional International Conservation Caucus
 Grid Innovation Caucus
Congressional Freethought Caucus
Congressional Asian Pacific American Caucus
Climate Solutions Caucus
Medicare for All Caucus

Political positions

United States Supreme Court

After the Supreme Court overturned Roe v. Wade in 2022, McNerney called it "a partisan body that is no longer a legitimate arbiter of our Constitution." He said it had a "far-right minority agenda" that is a "threat not only to our country, but to the world."

Electoral history

Personal life
McNerney resides in Stockton, California. He and his wife, Mary, have three children. McNerney is Roman Catholic.

References

External links

 

|-

|-

1951 births
21st-century American politicians
American people of Irish descent
American people of Swiss descent
Democratic Party members of the United States House of Representatives from California
Engineers from California
Living people
Mathematicians from California
Members of the United States House of Representatives from California
Military personnel from California
New Mexico Democrats
People from Pleasanton, California
Politicians from Albuquerque, New Mexico
United States Military Academy alumni
University of New Mexico alumni